CA7 or CA-7 can mean:
 Carbonic anhydrase 7, a human gene
 California's 7th congressional district
 California State Route 7
 CA-7 (software), a workflow automation package